"Somebody Special" is a song by British singer Rod Stewart, which was released in 1981 as the third single from his tenth studio album Foolish Behaviour (1980). The song was written by Stewart and Steve Harley (lyrics), and Phil Chen, Kevin Savigar, Jim Cregan and Gary Grainger (music). It was produced by Stewart (credited as Harry the Hook), with co-production by the Rod Stewart Group and Jeremy Andrew Johns. "Somebody Special" reached number 71 on the US Billboard Hot 100.

Background
Steve Harley co-wrote the lyrics to "Somebody Special" with Stewart. The pair also collaborated on the lyrics for another track that appeared on Foolish Behaviour, "Gi' Me Wings", as well as a third song that did not make the album. Harley recalled to Smiler in 1997, "I was sitting around at the Sunset Marquis for three weeks writing the lyrics. I wrote nearly all [the lyrics] of 'Somebody Special', I wrote lots of that with Rod, lots of it on my own, [and] 'Gi' Me Wings'."

Critical reception
On its release as a single, Record World commented, "Rod's jagged vocal delivery turns good lyrics into great ones, as on this successor to his top 10 'Passion'." In a review of Foolish Behaviour, John Griffin of The Montreal Gazette described "Somebody Special" as "a beautiful, affirmative piece of advice for those who wonder whether true love will ever walk into their lives." Bill Flanagan of The Boston Globe felt the song "could be a Commodores hit". Debra Rae Cohen of Rolling Stone described the song as "a soulful duet with Susan Grindell that's nearly as powerful as the Teddy Pendergrass–Stephanie Mills collaborations".

Track listing
7-inch single
"Somebody Special" - 4:28
"She Won't Dance with Me" - 2:27

7-inch single (US promo)
"Somebody Special" - 4:28
"Somebody Special" - 4:28

Personnel
Credits are adapted from the Foolish Behaviour LP sleeve notes.

Somebody Special
 Rod Stewart – vocals
 Gary Grainger, Jim Cregan – guitars
 Kevin Savigar – keyboards
 Phil Chen – bass
 Colin Allen – drums
 Paulinho da Costa – percussion
 Susan Grindell – female vocals
 Del Newman – string arrangement

Production
 Harry the Hook (Rod Stewart) – producer ("Somebody Special")
 Tom Dowd – producer ("She Won't Dance with Me")
 The Rod Stewart Group  – co-producers
 Jeremy Andrew Johns – co-producer, mixing
 Jim Cregan – mixing
 Rick Charles Delana – second engineer

Charts

References

1980 songs
1981 singles
Rod Stewart songs
Songs written by Rod Stewart
Songs written by Steve Harley
Songs written by Kevin Savigar
Songs written by Jim Cregan
Songs written by Gary Grainger
Warner Records singles